Cheiracanthium effossum is a spider species found in Central Europe to Russia.

See also 
 List of Eutichuridae species

References

External links 

effossum
Spiders of Europe
Spiders of Russia
Spiders described in 1879